An important aspect in the study of elliptic curves is devising effective ways of counting points on the curve. There have been several approaches to do so, and the algorithms devised have proved to be useful tools in the study of various fields such as number theory, and more recently in cryptography and Digital Signature Authentication (See elliptic curve cryptography and elliptic curve DSA). While in number theory they have important consequences in the solving of Diophantine equations, with respect to cryptography, they enable us to make effective use of the difficulty of the discrete logarithm problem (DLP) for the group , of elliptic curves over a finite field , where q = pk and p is a prime. The DLP, as it has come to be known, is a widely used approach to public key cryptography, and the difficulty in solving this problem determines the level of security of the cryptosystem.  This article covers algorithms to count points on elliptic curves over fields of large characteristic, in  particular p > 3. For curves over fields of small characteristic more efficient algorithms based on p-adic methods exist.

Approaches to counting points on elliptic curves

There are several approaches to the problem. Beginning with the naive approach, we trace the developments up to Schoof's definitive work on the subject, while also listing the improvements to Schoof's algorithm made by Elkies (1990) and Atkin (1992).

Several algorithms make use of the fact that groups of the form  are subject to an important theorem due to Hasse, that bounds the number of points to be considered.  Hasse's theorem states that if E is an elliptic curve over the finite field , then the cardinality of  satisfies

Naive approach

The naive approach to counting points, which is the least sophisticated, involves running through all the elements of the field  and testing which ones satisfy the Weierstrass form of the elliptic curve

Example
To count points on E, we make a
list of the possible values of x, then of the quadratic residues of x mod 5 (for lookup purpose only), then of x3 + x + 1 mod 5, then of y of x3 + x + 1 mod 5. This yields the points on E.

E.g. the last row is computed as follows: If you insert  in the equation x3 + x + 1 mod 5 you get  as result (3rd column). This result can be achieved if  (Quadratic residues can be looked up in the 2nd column).

Therefore,  has cardinality of 9: the 8 points listed before and the point at infinity.

This algorithm requires running time O(q), because all the values of  must be considered.

Baby-step giant-step
 
Hasse's theorem tells us that  lies in the interval .

 
The algorithm is as follows.

The algorithm

 1. choose  integer, 
 2. FOR{ to } DO 
 3.    
 4. ENDFOR
 5. 
 6. 
 7. REPEAT compute the points 
 8. UNTIL :   \\the -coordinates are compared
 9.      \\note 
 10. Factor .
 11. WHILE  DO
 12.    IF 
 13.       THEN 
 14.       ELSE  
 15.    ENDIF
 16. ENDWHILE
 17.      \\note  is the order of the point 
 18. WHILE  divides more than one integer  in 
 19.    DO choose a new point  and go to 1.
 20. ENDWHILE
 21. RETURN      \\it is the cardinality of

Notes to the algorithm
 
 In line 8. we assume the existence of a match. Indeed, the following lemma assures that such a match exists:

      
 Computing  once  has been computed can be done by adding  to  instead of computing the complete scalar multiplication anew.
 We are assuming that we can factor . If not, we can at least find all the small prime factors  and check that  for these.
 The conclusion of step 17 can be proved using elementary group theory: since , the order of  divides .

One drawback of this method is that there is a need for too much memory when the group becomes large. In order to address this, it might be more efficient to store only the  coordinates of the points  (along with the corresponding integer ).

There are other generic algorithms for computing the order of a group element that are more space efficient, such as Pollard's rho algorithm and the Pollard kangaroo method.

Schoof's algorithm

A theoretical breakthrough for the problem of computing the cardinality of groups of the type  was achieved by René Schoof, who, in 1985, published the first deterministic polynomial time algorithm. Central to Schoof's algorithm are the use of division polynomials and Hasse's theorem, along with the Chinese remainder theorem.

It suffices to compute  modulo an integer . This is achieved by computing  modulo primes  whose product exceeds , and then applying the Chinese remainder theorem. The key to the algorithm is using the division polynomial  to efficiently compute  modulo .

Schoof–Elkies–Atkin algorithm

In the 1990s, Noam Elkies, followed by A. O. L. Atkin devised improvements to Schoof's basic algorithm by making a distinction among the primes  that are used. Otherwise  is called an Atkin prime. Elkies primes are the key to improving the asymptotic complexity of Schoof's algorithm. Information obtained from the Atkin primes permits a further improvement which is asymptotically negligible but can be quite important in practice. The modification of Schoof's algorithm to use Elkies and Atkin primes is known as the Schoof–Elkies–Atkin (SEA) algorithm.

The status of a particular prime  depends on the elliptic curve , and can be determined using the modular polynomial . In the Elkies case, further computations involving modular polynomials are used to obtain a proper factor of the division polynomial .

Unlike Schoof's algorithm, the SEA algorithm is typically implemented as a probabilistic algorithm (of the Las Vegas type), so that root-finding and other operations can be performed more efficiently.

See also
 Schoof's algorithm
 Elliptic curve cryptography
 Baby-step giant-step
 Public key cryptography
 Schoof–Elkies–Atkin algorithm
 Pollard rho
 Pollard kangaroo
 Elliptic curve primality proving

Bibliography

 I. Blake, G. Seroussi, and N. Smart: Elliptic Curves in Cryptography, Cambridge University Press, 1999.
 A. Enge: Elliptic Curves and their Applications to Cryptography: An Introduction. Kluwer Academic Publishers, Dordrecht, 1999. 
Available at http://www.math.umn.edu/~musiker/schoof.pdf
 R. Schoof: Counting Points on Elliptic Curves over Finite Fields. J. Theor. Nombres Bordeaux 7:219-254, 1995. Available at http://www.mat.uniroma2.it/~schoof/ctg.pdf
 L. C. Washington: Elliptic Curves: Number Theory and Cryptography. Chapman \& Hall/CRC, New York, 2003.

References

Elliptic curves